All in Love is the seventh solo studio album release by American country music singer, Marie Osmond. It was her third album release for Curb/Capitol records and was issued in 1988.

Background 
Like Osmond's two previous albums for Curb/Capitol, All in Love consists of country pop-styled tracks. It includes a duet with Paul Davis, entitled "Sweet Life", as a cover of his own song.
Three singles were released from All in Love, and none of them broke into the Country Top 40; "Without a Trace," "Sweet Life," and "I'm in Love and He's in Dallas." The album reached a peak of #29 on the Billboard Top Country Albums chart on August 19, 1988.

Track listing 
 "I'm in Love and He's in Dallas" — (Richard Leigh, Kent Robbins) 2:54
 "Raining Tears" — (Robbins) 3:23
 "My Home Town Boy" — (Carol Ann Etheridge, Alice Randall, Lisa Silver) 3:51
 "Baby's Blue Eyes" — (Matraca Berg, Ronnie Samoset) 3:12
 "Lonely as the Night is Long" — (Paula Breedlove, Johnny MacRae, Bob Morrison) 3:33
 "99% of the Time" — (Paul Davis, Hillary Kanter, Amy Sky, Even Stevens) 3:43
 "Somebody Else's Moon" — (Beth Nielsen Chapman, Robbins) 4:07
 "Sweet Life" — (Susan Collins, Davis) 3:41
 "All in Love" — (Tony Haselden, Stan Munsey, Jr.) 3:07
 "Without a Trace" — (Katerina Kitridge, Sonny Throckmorton) 3:07

Personnel 
 Eddie Bayers — drums
 Michael Black — background vocals
 Jessica Boucher — background vocals
 Mike Brignardello — bass guitar
 Dennis Burnside — piano, synthesizer
 Larry Byrom — acoustic guitar, electric guitar
 Paul Davis — lead vocals on "Sweet Life"
 Paul Franklin — pedal steel guitar
 Greg Galbreath — acoustic guitar, electric guitar
 Steve Gibson — electric guitar
 Jon Goin — electric guitar
 Mark Hammond — drums
 Mitch Humphries — piano, synthesizer
 Dave Innis — piano, synthesizer
 Jana King — background vocals
 Alan Moore — string arrangements
 Nashville String Machine — strings
 Mark O'Connor — fiddle, mandolin
 Joe Osborn — bass guitar
 Marie Osmond — lead vocals, background vocals
 Martin Parker — drums
 Michael Rhodes — bass guitar
 Tom Robb — bass guitar
 Matt Rollings — piano, synthesizer
 Lisa Silver — background vocals
 James Stroud — drums
 Steve Turner — drums
 Diane Vanette — background vocals
 Bergen White — string arrangements
 Dennis Wilson — background vocals
 Paul Worley — acoustic guitar, electric guitar

Chart performance

Album

Singles

References 

1988 albums
Marie Osmond albums
Capitol Records albums
Albums produced by Paul Worley